S72 may refer to:

Aviation 
 Blériot-SPAD S.72, a French biplane trainer
 Savoia-Marchetti S.72, an Italian transport monoplane 
 Sikorsky S-72, an American experimental compound helicopter
 St. Maries Municipal Airport, in Benewah County, Idaho, United States

Other uses 
 , a submarine of the Royal Canadian Navy
 S72, a postcode district for Barnsley, England